Papaipema necopina, the sunflower borer moth, is a species of cutworm or dart moth in the family Noctuidae. It is found in North America.

The MONA or Hodges number for Papaipema necopina is 9497.

References

Further reading

External links

 

Papaipema
Articles created by Qbugbot
Moths described in 1876